Beki İkala Erikli (born Beki Çukran, 1968 – December 15, 2016) was a Turkish Jewish author of self-help books. She was shot to death in Istanbul on December 16, 2016.

References

2016 deaths
Writers from Istanbul
Self-help writers
Turkish Jews
1968 births
21st-century Turkish women writers
20th-century Turkish women writers
20th-century Turkish writers
Jewish women writers
Deaths by firearm in Turkey